Princess Cinderella School is a private English medium kindergarten, primary and high school in Maputo, Mozambique, teaching to the Cambridge Assessment International Education program.

External links

Schools in Mozambique
Cambridge schools in Mozambique
Private schools
Education in Maputo
1988 establishments in Mozambique
Educational institutions established in 1988